Jefferson Township is a township in Chautauqua County, Kansas, USA.  As of the 2000 census, its population was 834.

Geography
According to the USGS, it contains three cemeteries: Cedar Vale, Grant Creek and Round Mound.

The streams of Otter Creek, Shanghai Creek, Turkey Creek and Union Creek run through this township.

Transportation
Jefferson Township contains one airport or landing strip, Mills Ranch Airport.

References
 USGS Geographic Names Information System (GNIS)

External links
 US-Counties.com
 City-Data.com

Townships in Chautauqua County, Kansas
Townships in Kansas